The 48th Annual Tony Awards was broadcast by CBS from the Gershwin Theatre on June 12, 1994. The hosts were Sir Anthony Hopkins and Amy Irving.

Presenters
George Abbott, Alan Alda, Jane Alexander, Carol Burnett, Nell Carter, Glenn Close, Tony Danza, Ossie Davis, Ruby Dee, Peter Falk, Melanie Griffith, Madeline Kahn, Harvey Keitel, Jack Klugman, Swoosie Kurtz, Linda Lavin, Michael Learned, Steve Martin, Bebe Neuwirth, Rosie O'Donnell, Bernadette Peters, Tony Randall, Tony Roberts, Martin Short, Paul Sorvino, Jean Stapleton, Marlo Thomas, Gwen Verdon, Vanessa L. Williams

Musical Sequence
Victor Garber introduced scenes from the 1994 nominees for Best Revival of a Musical:
Grease ("We Go Together" – Company);
She Loves Me ("I Don't Know His Name"/"She Loves Me" – Diane Fratantoni, Sally Mayes and Boyd Gaines);
Damn Yankees ("Shoeless Joe From Hannibal, Mo." – Vicki Lewis and Company);
Carousel ("You'll Never Walk Alone"- Shirley Verrett and Company).
Vanessa L. Williams on live remote from Toronto introduced Show Boat ("Ol' Man River" – Michel Bell and Company).

Musicals represented
A Grand Night for Singing ("People Will Say We're in Love"/"Some Enchanted Evening"/"It's a Grand Night for Singing" – Company);
Beauty and the Beast ("Me"/"Be Our Guest"/"If I Can't Love Her"/"Beauty and the Beast" – Company);
Cyrano: The Musical (Company);
Passion ("Happiness"/"Drums and Music"/"Finale" – Company).

This was the first year for several awards: the award for Best Revival was given separately for plays and musicals, and the "Lifetime Achievement Award". The first Lifetime Achievement Award was presented to husband-and-wife Jessica Tandy and Hume Cronyn by another husband-and-wife, Ossie Davis and Ruby Dee.

Award winners and nominees
Winners are in bold

Special Tony Awards
 Regional Theatre Award — McCarter Theatre
 Lifetime Achievement Award — Jessica Tandy and Hume Cronyn

Multiple nominations and awards

These productions had multiple nominations:

10 nominations: Passion 
9 nominations: Beauty and the Beast and She Loves Me 
6 nominations: Angels in America: Perestroika 
5 nominations: Carousel and An Inspector Calls 
4 nominations: Cyrano: The Musical and Damn Yankees 
3 nominations: Abe Lincoln in Illinois, Grease, The Kentucky Cycle, Medea, Picnic and Timon of Athens 
2 nominations: A Grand Night for Singing and Twilight: Los Angeles, 1992 

The following productions received multiple awards.

5 wins: Carousel 
4 wins: An Inspector Calls and Passion  
3 wins: Angels in America: Perestroika

See also
 Drama Desk Awards
 1994 Laurence Olivier Awards – equivalent awards for West End theatre productions
 Obie Award
 New York Drama Critics' Circle
 Theatre World Award
 Lucille Lortel Awards

References

External links
 Official Site Tony Awards

Tony Awards ceremonies
1994 in theatre
1994 theatre awards
Tony
1994 in New York City